US Post Office-Canajoharie is a historic post office building located at Canajoharie in Montgomery County, New York, United States. It was built in 1937, and is one of a number of post offices in New York State designed by the Office of the Supervising Architect of the Treasury Department under Louis A. Simon.  It is a one-story, symmetrical brick building on a stone watertable in the Colonial Revival style.  It features a gable roof with a square, flat topped cupola with Doric order pilasters and round-arched vent openings.  The interior features a 1942 mural by Anatol Shulkin (1899-1961) titled Invention of the Paper Bag in Canajoharie. 

Both the Library and the Mural are New Deal Projects.. ' "The New Deal" refers to a series of domestic programs (lasting roughly from 1933 to 1939) implemented during the administration of President Franklin D. Roosevelt to combat the effects of the Great Depression on the U.S. economy.' 

It was listed on the National Register of Historic Places in 1988. It is located in the Canajoharie Historic District.

References

External links

Canajoharie
Government buildings completed in 1937
Colonial Revival architecture in New York (state)
Buildings and structures in Montgomery County, New York
National Register of Historic Places in Montgomery County, New York
Individually listed contributing properties to historic districts on the National Register in New York (state)
1937 establishments in New York (state)